The celiac plexus (or solar plexus) is a complex network of nerves located in the abdomen.

Solar plexus or Solar Plexus may also refer to:

The solar plexus chakra in mаоаsticism and Hinduism, see Manipura

Music
Solar Plexus (album), a 2012 compilation by Mavin Records
Solar Plexus, a 2014 album by Thea Hjelmeland
Solar Plexus, a 1972 album by the Swedish jazz-fusion-pop band Solar Plexus, with Tommy Körberg
Volume 1: Solar Plexus, a 2011 EP by The Empire Shall Fall
"Solar Plexus", a 1997 song by BT from ESCM